Datuk Anthony Kevin Morais ( 22 March 1960 – September 2015)  was a Deputy Public Prosecutor for the Attorney General's Chambers of Malaysia and Malaysian Anti-Corruption Commission (MACC).

Life
Kevin Anthony Morais was born on 22 March 1960 in Kuala Lumpur.

Murder
Morais was last seen alive on 4 September 2015 leaving his Menara Duta condominium in Segambut, Kuala Lumpur for work at the Attorney-General's Chambers in Putrajaya. He drove a Proton Perdana with license plates WA6264Q. His youngest  brother filed a missing person's report late next day. Earlier, a car matching the model he owned was found in a palm oil plantation in Perak. His body was found in a concrete filled drum at USJ 1, Subang Jaya, Selangor on 16 September 2015.

On 20 November 2017 six were accused of the murder of Morais after the courts found that the prosecution had proven a prima facie against them. The six accused were former Army pathologist Colonel Dr R. Kunaseegaran, 55; R. Dinishwaran, 26; A.K Thinesh Kumar, 25; M. Vishwanath, 28; S. Nimalan 25; and S. Ravi Chandaran, 47.

Initially, there were seven accused individuals in the trial; however, G. Gunasekaran was discharged and acquitted in 2016 after the prosecution had applied to withdraw the charge against him. The Sessions Court sentenced Gunasekaran to two years in jail effective from the date of his arrest on September 15, 2015, after he pleaded guilty to concealing Kevin Morais' body and disposing of the plate number of the deceased's car. The prosecution set out to prove that the motive for the murder of Kevin Morais had been revenge as Morais had been the prosecuting officer in the corruption case against Kunaseegaran.

On July 10, 2020, after a lengthy 4 year court case, the High Court handed the death sentence to all six accused and sentenced to hanging.

Legacy
On 27 November 2015, in conjunction with the 59th birthday of the Sultan of Perak. Anthony Kevin Morais received the Darjah Datuk Paduka Mahkota Perak (DPMP), which carries the title "Datuk" from the 35th Sultan of Perak, Sultan Nazrin Muizzuddin Shah.

In the Malaysian Anti Corruption Academy, there is a moot court named "Kevin Morais Moot Court" which was renamed after his death.

In 2020, Morais was named as one of the two recipients of the International Anti-Corruption Award 2020 at the Perdana International Anti-Corruption Champion Fund (PIACCF).

Honours 

 Officer of the Order of the Defender of the Realm (K.M.N.) (2009)
 Commander of the Order of Meritorious Service (P.J.N.)	- Datuk (2016 - Posthumously)

 Knight Commander of the Order of the Perak State Crown (D.P.M.P.) - Dato’ (2015 - Posthumously)

References

External links
 Kronologi kehilangan Kevin Anthony Morais, Berita Harian 
 Malaysia prosecutor Kevin Morais found dead in oil drum, BBC 

Officers of the Order of the Defender of the Realm
Commanders of the Order of Meritorious Service
People murdered in Malaysia
Malaysian murder victims
1960 births
2015 deaths
2015 murders in Malaysia
Malaysian people of Indian descent